Scartichthys is a genus of combtooth blennies found in the Atlantic and Indian ocean.

Species
There are currently four recognized species in this genus:
 Scartichthys crapulatus J. T. Williams, 1990
 Scartichthys gigas (Steindachner, 1876) (Giant blenny)
 Scartichthys variolatus (Valenciennes, 1836)
 Scartichthys viridis (Valenciennes, 1836)

References

 
Salarinae
Taxa named by David Starr Jordan